U-91 may refer to one of the following German submarines:

 , a Type U 87 submarine launched in 1917 and that served in the First World War until surrendered on 26 November 1918; broken up at Brest in 1921
 During the First World War, Germany also had these submarines with similar names:
 , a Type UB III submarine launched in 1918 and surrendered on 21 November 1918; broken up at Briton Ferry in 1919–20
 , a Type UC III submarine launched in 1918 and sunk on 10 January 1919 on way to surrender
 , a Type VIIC submarine that served in the Second World War until sunk on 26 February 1944

Submarines of Germany